Roknabad-ye Yek (also Romanized as Roknābād-e Yek; also known as Rokīnow and Roknābād) is a village in Kuh Panj Rural District, in the Central District of Bardsir County, Kerman Province, Iran. At the 2006 census, its population was 12, in 5 families.

References 

Populated places in Bardsir County